The 2013 Philadelphia Union season is the fourth season of the team's existence, competing in Major League Soccer, the top flight of American soccer. The team was managed by John Hackworth, in his second season with the club and first full season after taking over from Peter Nowak midway through the 2012 season.

Background

This was the 4th season in MLS for the Philadelphia and the first full year under manager John Hackworth.

2013 roster
As of October 1, 2013.

Out on loan

Match results

Preseason friendlies

2013 Walt Disney World Pro Soccer Classic

MLS regular season

The Union ended the season 12-12-10 overall, 7-5-5 at home, 5-7-5 on the road.

U.S. Open Cup

The Union, along with the other 15 US-based MLS teams, will enter the U.S. Open Cup in the Third Round.

Friendlies

MLS Reserve League 

The Union have chosen to affiliate with the USL-Pro's Harrisburg City Islanders and as such, will not field a reserve team this season.

League table

Conference

Overall

Results summary

Coaching staff

Squad information

Squad breakdown

Ages are as of March 1, 2013.

Statistics

Statistics are from all MLS league matches.

* = Not currently part of team.

Goalkeepers

* = Not currently part of team.

Honors and awards

MLS Player of the Month

MLS Player of the Week

MLS Team of the Week

MLS All-Stars 2013

Player movement

Transfers

In

Out

Loans

In

Out

Harrisburg Loanees

As part of the Union's agreement with the Harrisburg City Islanders, the following players have, at one point or another during the season, been loaned to Harrisburg.  The City Islanders must have a minimum of four Union loanees on their roster at any one time.

Miscellany

Allocation ranking 

The Union are currently 5th in the MLS Allocation Ranking.

International roster slots 

The Union have eight MLS International Roster Slots for use in the 2013 season. Each club in Major League Soccer is allocated eight international roster spots per season.

Notes:

 Sébastien Le Toux was born in France, but is not considered an international player as he is a permanent resident of the US.
 Antoine Hoppenot and Michael Lahoud were born in France and Sierra Leone, respectively, but both are American citizens.

Future draft pick trades 

Future picks acquired

 On March 1, 2013, the Union traded Chandler Hoffman to Los Angeles Galaxy for a conditional 2014 MLS SuperDraft pick.
 On May 14, 2013, the Union traded Gabriel Farfan to C.D. Chivas USA for a first round 2014 MLS SuperDraft pick and allocation money.
 On May 23, 2013, the Union traded Bakary Soumaré to Chicago Fire for a second round 2014 MLS SuperDraft pick and allocation money.
 On September 13, 2013, the Union traded Chris Konopka to Toronto FC for a third round 2014 MLS SuperDraft pick.

References

External links
 Philadelphia Union website

2013
2013 Major League Soccer season
American soccer clubs 2013 season
2013 in sports in Pennsylvania